Light dues are the charges levied on ships for the maintenance of lighthouses and other aids to navigation.

British Isles
Light dues are levied on commercial vessels and larger pleasure boats calling at ports in the British Isles and paid into the General Lighthouse Fund (GLF), which is under the stewardship of the UK's Department for Transport and is used to finance the lighthouse services provided by the three general lighthouse authorities that cover all of the British Isles:
 Trinity House for England, Wales, Gibraltar and the Channel Islands
 Northern Lighthouse Board for Scotland and the Isle of Man
 Commissioners of Irish Lights for the Republic of Ireland and Northern Ireland

The main principles of the light dues system are:
 The UK Department for Transport sets the level of light dues in the UK, which is reviewed annually, taking advice from the General Lighthouse Authorities and representatives of the shipping industry. The Irish Department of Transport, Tourism and Sport sets the level of light dues in the Republic of Ireland.
 In most cases, the rate charged is based on the net tonnage of the vessel. In 2022/23 the UK rate will rise to 41 pence per ton.
 A vessel pays light dues when it first calls at a port in the UK or Ireland; thereafter it is exempt from further payments for one month. Each vessel is charged for a maximum of nine voyages per annum.
 Vessels calling in the UK and Republic of Ireland are required to pay the rate applicable at the port where they are first liable to pay light dues. The nine voyage cap applies regardless of whether the port calls are in the UK or Ireland.
 Tugs and fishing vessels (of 10 metres; 33' in length or more) make an annual payment based on the registered length of the vessel. Pleasure boats (of 20 tons or more) make a monthly payment up to an annual maximum.

Increasing automation of aids to navigation in the British Isles has seen the rate of light dues fall in real terms over recent years. The first increase in the light dues rate for twenty years occurred in 2009. In 2010, with the rate at 41p, the UK Government announced that there would be no further increases for at least the next three years. The rate was then cut by one penny in each of 2014, 2015 and 2016, with a further half penny in 2017 to reach 37.5p. Since 2021 the rate hs been increased twice and is now again at the 2010 level.

Also in 2010, the UK Government announced it had reached agreement with the Irish Government that aids to navigation off the coast of the Republic of Ireland would be wholly funded from domestic sources there by 2015-16. Changes to the way light dues payments are enforced in the UK and Ireland were implemented from 1 April 2015 to give effect to this agreement.

References

Lighthouses
Navigation